Michael Nathanson may refer to:
Michael Nathanson (actor), American actor
Michael Nathanson (director), Canadian playwright and theatre director
Michael Nathanson (film executive), American film industry executive